Rytigynia is a genus of flowering plants in the family Rubiaceae. It is found  in tropical and southern Africa. The genera Rytigynia and Fadogia form a strongly supported clade but neither of these genera is monophyletic.

Distribution
Rytigynia is found in Tropical Africa. R. senegalensis and R. umbellulata are the two most widespread species and they are found from Senegal to Sudan to Botswana. R. celastroides has the southernmost distribution and occurs as far south as KwaZulu-Natal. However, most species are more restricted in distribution area and they are often found in either West or East Africa. Half of the species is even endemic to one country. One-third of all Rytigynia species is found in Tanzania, and many of them are endemics.

Bacterial leaf symbiosis
Endophytic bacteria are housed in the intercellular space of the leaf mesophyll tissue. The presence of these bacteria can only be microscopically ascertained. The bacteria are identified as Burkholderia, which is a genus that is also found in the leaves of other Rubiaceae species. The hypothesis is that these endophytic bacteria provide chemical protection against insect herbivory.

Species

 Rytigynia acuminatissima (K.Schum.) Robyns
 Rytigynia adenodonta (K.Schum.) Robyns
 Rytigynia argentea (Wernham) Robyns
 Rytigynia bagshawei (S.Moore) Robyns
 Rytigynia beniensis (De Wild.) Robyns
 Rytigynia binata (K.Schum.) Robyns
 Rytigynia bomiliensis (De Wild.) Robyns
 Rytigynia bridsoniae Verdc.
 Rytigynia bugoyensis (K.Krause) Verdc.
 Rytigynia canthioides (Benth.) Robyns
 Rytigynia caudatissima Verdc.
 Rytigynia celastroides (Baill.) Verdc.
 Rytigynia claessensii (De Wild.) Robyns
 Rytigynia claviflora Robyns
 Rytigynia congesta (K.Krause) Robyns
 Rytigynia constricta Robyns
 Rytigynia dasyothamnus (K.Schum.) Robyns
 Rytigynia decussata (K.Schum.) Robyns
 Rytigynia demeusei (De Wild.) Robyns
 Rytigynia dewevrei (De Wild. & T.Durand) Robyns
 Rytigynia dichasialis Lantz & Gereau
 Rytigynia dubiosa (De Wild.) Robyns
 Rytigynia eickii (K.Schum. & K.Krause) Bullock
 Rytigynia erythroxyloides (Baill.) A.P.Davis & Govaerst
 Rytigynia ferruginea Robyns
 Rytigynia flavida Robyns
 Rytigynia glabrifolia (De Wild.) Robyns
 Rytigynia gossweileri Robyns
 Rytigynia gracilipetiolata (De Wild.) Robyns
 Rytigynia griseovelutina Verdc.
 Rytigynia hirsutiflora Verdc.
 Rytigynia humbertii Cavaco
 Rytigynia ignobilis Verdc.
 Rytigynia kigeziensis Verdc.
 Rytigynia kiwuensis  (K.Krause) Robyns
 Rytigynia krauseana Robyns
 Rytigynia laurentii (De Wild.) Robyns
 Rytigynia lecomtei Robyns
 Rytigynia leonensis (K.Schum.) Robyns
 Rytigynia lewisii Tennant
 Rytigynia liberica Robyns
 Rytigynia lichenoxenos (K.Schum.) Robyns
 Rytigynia longicaudata Verdc.
 Rytigynia longipedicellata Verdc.
 Rytigynia longituba Verdc.
 Rytigynia macrostipulata Robyns
 Rytigynia macrura Verdc.
 Rytigynia madagascariensis Homolle ex Cavaco
 Rytigynia mayumbensis Robyns
 Rytigynia membranacea (Hiern) Robyns
 Rytigynia monantha (K.Schum.) Robyns
 Rytigynia mrimaensis Verdc.
 Rytigynia mutabilis Robyns
 Rytigynia neglecta (Hiern) Robyns
 Rytigynia nigerica (S.Moore) Robyns
 Rytigynia nodulosa (K.Schum.) Robyns
 Rytigynia obscura Robyns
 Rytigynia orbicularis (K.Schum.) Robyns
 Rytigynia parvifolia Verdc.
 Rytigynia pauciflora (Schweinf. ex Hiern) R.D.Good
 Rytigynia pawekiae Verdc.
 Rytigynia pergracilis Verdc.
 Rytigynia pseudolongicaudata Verdc.
 Rytigynia pubescens Verdc.
 Rytigynia rhamnoides Robyns
 Rytigynia rubiginosa (K.Schum.) Robyns
 Rytigynia rubra Robyns
 Rytigynia ruwenzoriensis (De Wild.) Robyns
 Rytigynia saliensis Verdc.
 Rytigynia sambavensis Cavaco
 Rytigynia senegalensis Blume
 Rytigynia setosa Robyns
 Rytigynia seyrigii Cavaco
 Rytigynia squamata (De Wild.) Robyns
 Rytigynia stolzii Robyns
 Rytigynia subbiflora (Mildbr.) Robyns
 Rytigynia syringifolia (Baker) A.P.Davis & Govaerts
 Rytigynia torrei Verdc.
 Rytigynia uhligii (K.Schum. & K.Krause) Verdc.
 Rytigynia umbellulata (Hiern) Robyns
 Rytigynia verruculosa (K.Krause) Robyns
 Rytigynia xanthotricha (K.Schum.) Verdc.

References

External links
Rytigynia in the World Checklist of Rubiaceae
 Rytigynia At:Index Nominum Genericorum At: References At: NMNH Department of Botany

Flora of Africa
Rubiaceae genera
Vanguerieae
Taxonomy articles created by Polbot